The 1938 NCAA Swimming and Diving Championships were contested at the College Avenue Gym at Rutgers University in New Brunswick, New Jersey at the 15th annual NCAA-sanctioned swim meet to determine the team and individual national champions of men's collegiate swimming and diving in the United States. 

Michigan repeated as national champions, edging rivals  Ohio State by one point (46–45) in the team standings. It was the Wolverines' second official national title.

Team results
Note: Top 10 only
(H) = Hosts

See also
List of college swimming and diving teams

References

NCAA Division I Men's Swimming and Diving Championships
NCAA Swimming And Diving Championships
NCAA Swimming And Diving Championships